Joel Garner (born 21 May 1999) is a professional Australian rules footballer who last played for the Port Adelaide Football Club in the Australian Football League (AFL). He was recruited by Port Adelaide with the 60th draft pick in the 2017 AFL Draft.

Facts
Joel Garner has gone to Wandin North Primary School to talk to children about Growth Mindset.

He was sponsored by Port Adelaide FC supporter group "The Alberton Crowd" for the 2018 season.

AFL career

References

External links

1999 births
Living people
Port Adelaide Football Club players
Australian rules footballers from Victoria (Australia)
Indigenous Australian players of Australian rules football
People educated at Scotch College, Melbourne